The Age of reason, or the Enlightenment, was an intellectual and philosophical movement that dominated the world of ideas in Europe during the 17th to 19th centuries.

Age of reason or Age of Reason may also refer to:

 Age of reason (canon law), the age at which children attain the use of reason and begin to have moral responsibility
 The Age of Reason, a theological work by Thomas Paine published 1794–1807
 The Age of Reason (novel), a 1945 novel by Jean-Paul Sartre
 Age of Reason (album), a 1988 album by John Farnham
 "Age of Reason" (song)
 "Age of Reason", a song by Black Sabbath from the 2013 album 13
 "The Age of Reason" (Boardwalk Empire), a 2011 episode of the TV series
 Age of Reason, a blog of the National Youth Rights Association
 The Age of Reason (film), final part of the documentary film series The Doon School Quintet 
 Patriotic Enlightenment Period: Resistance movements during the Korea under Japanese rule, defined by North Korea.

See also

 The Age of Unreason, a series of science fiction novels by Gregory Keyes
 Cult of Reason, a brief time during the French Revolution
 "Rage of Reason", a 2008 song by Vesania from the album Distractive Killusions